This is a list of women who have served as members of the European Parliament for Ireland.

List

Footnotes

References

Sources
European Parliament office in Ireland – Irish MEPs: 1979–84. Retrieved 23 July 2016.
European Parliament office in Ireland – Irish MEPs: 1984–89. Retrieved 23 July 2016.
European Parliament office in Ireland – Irish MEPs: 1989–94. Retrieved 23 July 2016.
European Parliament office in Ireland – Irish MEPs: 1994–99. Retrieved 23 July 2016.
European Parliament office in Ireland – Irish MEPs: 1999–2004. Retrieved 23 July 2016.
European Parliament office in Ireland – Irish MEPs: 2004–09. Retrieved 23 July 2016.
European Parliament office in Ireland – Irish MEPs: 2009–14. Retrieved 23 July 2016.
European Parliament office in Ireland – Irish MEPs: 2014–19. Retrieved 5 January 2017.

 List
+Women
Ireland, Republic of
European Parliament